The Chiappa Rhino is a revolver produced by Italian manufacturer Chiappa Firearms.  The Rhino's frame is CNC-machined from a solid block of high-tensile aluminium alloy and all internal parts are CNC-machined from steel.

Chambered for the .357 Magnum/.38 Special, 9mm Parabellum, .40 S&W, or 9×21mm cartridges, its most distinctive feature is that the barrel is on a much lower bore axis, as the Rhino fires from the lowermost chamber of the cylinder rather than from the topmost chamber in conventional revolvers.

Design details
Designed by Emilio Ghisoni and Antonio Cudazzo, the Rhino differs from traditional revolvers in a number of ways. Stylistically it resembles Ghisoni's earlier design, the Mateba Autorevolver, and was his last design before his death in 2008.

In order to reduce weight, the frame of the Rhino is made of Ergal (an aluminium alloy), and the receiver is CNC-machined from a solid block of high-tensile aluminium.  Virtually all components are CNC-machined as well; this manufacturing process yields a very precise fit with minimal tolerances.  For models other than the 20D, the trigger may be used in either single-action or double-action mode.  Only the 2-inch 20D model comes in double-action only.

The external cocking lever is not actually a hammer as on most revolvers.  Instead, it is merely a linkage handle used to cock an internal hammer, and immediately falls back into place after cocking is complete, minimizing the number of externally moving parts and reciprocating mass.  An additional feature of this gun is, unlike most revolvers, it comes with an accessory rail (except for the 2 inch and 3 inch models), on which tactical lights and laser sights can be mounted.  The aluminium-based revolver is available in anodized finishes resembling traditional bluing, as well as a version resembling electroless nickel finish referred as the "White Rhino". A gold-colored version was displayed at the 2014 SHOT Show.

Firing from the lowermost chamber in the cylinder as opposed to the uppermost is intended to reduce muzzle flip by aligning the recoil more into the shooter's wrist, rather than above it.  A downside of this design is that it increases the vertical distance between the sight line and the bore axis (sight height), meaning the gun will have a greater parallax error when aiming at close range.  Another distinctive feature is that the cross-section of its cylinder is hexagonal (though with rounded corners) instead of circular; this is intended to narrow the weapon's profile in concealed carry applications.

Variants
Chiappa manufactures the Rhino in a number of sizes, barrel lengths, finishes, and calibers; including a frame that is made from polymer instead of aluminum.
 POLYLITE 20DS with a polymer frame
 20D (double-action only 2 inch barrel)
 20DS (double-action/single-action 2 inch barrel)
 30DS (double-action/single-action 3 inch barrel)
 40DS (double-action/single-action 4 inch barrel)
 50DS (double-action/single-action 5 inch barrel)
 60DS (double-action/single-action 6 inch barrel)

See also

 Mateba Autorevolver
 RSh-12

References

External links
 Chiappa Product Page with images

Chiappa Firearms
Revolvers of Italy
Weapons and ammunition introduced in 2009
.357 Magnum firearms
9mm Parabellum revolvers
.40 S&W firearms
9×21mm IMI firearms